Horst Jaeger (6 July 1934 - 3 April 2018) was a gregarious German businessman and Anglophile who was awarded the Cross of the Order of Merit of Germany for his efforts in improving Anglo-German relations. He was a senior executive in the firm of Mannesmann.

References 

1934 births
2018 deaths
German business executives
Businesspeople from Berlin
University of Tübingen alumni
Recipients of the Order of Merit of the Federal Republic of Germany